An air navigation service provider (ANSP) is a public or a private legal entity providing Air Navigation Services.   It manages air traffic on behalf of a company, region or country. Depending on the specific mandate an ANSP provides one or more of the following services to airspace users
 Air Traffic Management (ATM) 
 Communication navigation and surveillance systems (CNS)
 Meteorological service for air navigation (MET)
 Search and rescue (SAR)
 Aeronautical information services/aeronautical information management (AIS/AIM). 
These services are provided to air traffic during all phases of operations (approach, aerodrome and en-route).

Air navigation service providers are either government departments, state-owned companies, or privatised organisations. The majority of the world's Air Navigation Service Providers are members of the Civil Air Navigation Services Organisation located at Amsterdam Airport Schiphol.

List of providers

See also 
 List of CANSO members
 List of civil aviation authorities
 E-Learning Developers' Community of Practice

References

External links
CANSO Members

 
Air traffic control